The 2019 Penn Quakers football team represented the University of Pennsylvania during the 2019 NCAA Division I FCS football season. They were led by fifth-year head coach Ray Priore and played its home games at Franklin Field. It was a member of the Ivy League. They finished the season 5–5, 3–4 in Ivy League play to tie for fourth place. Penn averaged 8,426 fans per game.

Previous season

The Quakers finished the 2018 season 6–4, 3–4 in Ivy League play, to finish in a three-way tie for fourth place.

Preseason

Preseason media poll
The Ivy League released its preseason media poll on August 8, 2019. The Quakers were picked to finish in fifth place.

Schedule

Game summaries

at Delaware

at Lafayette

Dartmouth

Sacred Heart

at Columbia

at Yale

Brown

Cornell

at Harvard

Princeton

References

Penn
Penn Quakers football seasons
Penn Quakers football